Circus Bar is the second solo and final studio album by ex-Bad Company singer Brian Howe. Produced by Brooks Paschal and mixed by Rafe McKenna, the album includes two newly recorded remakes of the Bad Company hits "How About That" and "Holy Water".

Some friends helped Brian in shaping up Circus Bar: Wayne Nelson of Little River Band dropped by the studio for a few days and also Pat Travers popped in and played guitar on "My Town".

Track listing
 I'm Back
 Life's Mystery
 There's This Girl
 Could Have Been You
 Surrounded
 Flying
 How It Could Have Been
 My Town
 How 'Bout That (new version)
 Feels Like I'm Coming Home
 If You Want Trouble
 Feelings
 Holy Water (new version)
 Little George Street

Personnel
Brian Howe- lead vocals
Brooks Paschal, Dean Aicher, James Paul Wisner, Tyson Shipman- guitar
Pat Travers- electric guitar (“My Town”)
Brooks Paschal, Miguel Gonzalez, Wayne Nelson- bass guitar
Matt Brown- drums 
Luke Davids- keyboards

External links

2010 albums